Clan Anderson is a Scottish clan that is recognized as such by the Lord Lyon King of Arms. However, as the clan does not currently have a chief recognized by the Court of the Lord Lyon, it is therefore considered an armigerous clan. Variations of the surname are however considered septs of several other clans of the Scottish Highlands: The surname MacAndrews is considered a sept of the Clan Mackintosh and Clan Chattan, and also associated with the Clan MacDonell of Glengarry. The surnames Andrew and Andrews are considered septs of the Clan Ross.

History

Origins

As Saint Andrew is the patron saint of Scotland the surname Anderson, which means Son of Andrew is commonly found throughout  most of the country. The Scottish Gaelic derivation of the name is Gilleaindreas which means servant of Andrew. The Scottish historian, Ian Grimble, states that although arms were granted to an Anderson of that ilk in the sixteenth century, as the name is so widespread no exact place of origin can be established.

16th and 17th centuries

The historian George Fraser Black lists Andersons as being burgesses of Peebles as well as in the county of Dumfries. In 1585 John Anderson was a commissioner to Parliament for Cupar. Alexander Anderson was a famous mathematician who was born near Aberdeen and later settled in Paris, where he published works on Algebra and Geometry. Alexander's kinsman, David Anderson of Finshaugh, also a scientist, is renowned for removing a rock that was obstructing the entrance to Aberdeen harbour with the application of science and mechanics. His wife Jean Anderson was a noted philanthropist.

19th and 20th centuries

In 1863 William Anderson published his famous biographical history of the people of Scotland, The Scottish Nation, in three volumes. In this book he praised the above-mentioned rock remover, David Anderson, stating that he had been rich enough and generous enough to found and endow a hospital in Aberdeen for the maintenance and education of ten poor orphans, although it was Jean Anderson (and her relatives) who made that gift after he died.

In the 20th century the name is remembered for the famous Anderson shelters, a type of bomb shelter that was designed by John Anderson, 1st Viscount Waverley, during World War II.

21st century

Anderson Clan Society

The  Clan Anderson Society was formed in 1973 and is active throughout North America. A clan room and archival display are maintained at Wyseby House in Kirtlebridge, Dumfriesshire. The Clan Anderson Society was Granted Letters Patent Clan Anderson Society Coat of Arms by Lyon Court in 2014 and Dr. Joseph Morrow Lord Lyon King of Arms presented the Letters Patent to the Clan Anderson Society at the Loch Norman Highland Games in North Carolina in April 2014. The Clan Anderson Society Coat of Arms  depicts the more inclusive Clan Anderson motto WE STAND SURE .

Cadet branches
As the Clan has never been able to proclaim a Chief, there are no cadet branches for this clan. However, the major families have been identified as Anderson of Ardbrake & Westerton (whose crest is used by Andersons as a clansman's crest badge); Anderson of Kinneddar (scion of the Ardbrake line), Anderson of Noth, Anderson of Newbiggin & Kingask, Anderson of Dowhill & Stobcross, Anderson of Linkwood, Anderson of Inchyra & Stonyhill, Seton-Anderson of Mounie and Anderson of Candacraig.

Highland MacAndrews

In the Scottish Highlands the surname MacAndrew is considered a sept of the Clan Mackintosh or Chattan Confederation and MacAndrews were also associated with the Clan MacDonell of Glengarry. The surnames Andrew and Andrews are also considered septs of the Highland Clan Ross.

Clan profile
 Motto: "Stand Sure" (Anderson of Ardbrake & Westerton, plus Anderson of Kinneddar)
 Crest: An oak tree Proper (Anderson of Ardbrake & Westerton, plus Anderson of Kinneddar)
 Gaelic Name: Mac Aindrais
 Badge: On a wreath of the liveries, an oak tree Proper within a circlet belt & buckle
 Lands: Aberdeenshire, Banff & Moray
 Origin of Name: "Son of Andrew"
 Tartan:  First seen in 1815 when collected by the "Highland Society of London." It has an azure field and it is one of several Scottish tartans woven with seven colours.

Septs
Andrew, Anderson, Andrews, Gillanders, MacAndrew, M'Anderson.

See also

Clan Gillanders

References

External links
 Clan Anderson
 Clan Anderson Society
  Matrikel öfwer Swea rikes ridderskap och adel ... (1754) (Noble Scots Andersons recorded in Sweden)

Scottish clans
Armigerous clans